The 1995–96 Syracuse Orangemen basketball team represented Syracuse University as a member of the Big East Conference. The head coach was Jim Boeheim, serving for his 20th year. The team played its home games at the Carrier Dome in Syracuse, New York.  The team finished with a 29–9 (12–6) record, while making it to the Championship Game of the NCAA tournament.

The team was led by seniors John Wallace and Lazarus Sims. Fellow senior J.B. Reafsnyder, juniors Jason Cipolla and Otis Hill, sophomore Todd Burgan and Marius Janulis played key roles. Walk-on and future NFL star Donovan McNabb also appeared in five games.

Season recap
Syracuse was aided by the return of John Wallace, who had declared for the NBA draft, but chose to withdraw his early entry. Wallace would lead Syracuse in scoring for 30-of-38 games, leading Syracuse to an early 11–0 record.

With the Orangemen hitting a bump in mid-season losing five of eight Big East games, Boeheim chose to insert Jason Cipolla into the starting lineup in favor of Marius Janulis. The move worked as Syracuse would go 8–1 to finish the regular season with a record of 22–7. Syracuse would advance to the Big East tournament semifinals, where it was knocked off by Connecticut, 85–67.

Syracuse was named a No. 4 seed for the tournament, and played one of its most memorable games in the Sweet 16 against Georgia. Cipolla hit a jumper as time expired in regulation to send the game to overtime, and John Wallace sealed the victory with a 3-pointer with 2 seconds remaining to propel Syracuse to an 83–81 win. Wallace finished with 30 points and 15 rebounds in that game.

Syracuse would knock off the Paul Pierce, Raef LaFrentz and Jacques Vaughn-led Kansas in the Elite 8, and Erick Dampier and the Mississippi State Bulldogs in the national semifinal game. This set up a matchup between Jim Boeheim and former assistant Rick Pitino, who was now head coach of the Kentucky Wildcats in the National Championship game.

Syracuse, a heavy underdog, nearly overcame a 13-point second-half deficit, closing to within 2, but Kentucky held on for a 76–67 victory. Kentucky featured a deep team, including future NBA players Derek Anderson, Antoine Walker, Tony Delk and Ron Mercer.

Roster
John Wallace (22.2 points, 8.7 rebounds)
Jason Cipolla (7.7 points, 2.0 rebounds)
Lazarus Sims (6.3 points, 7.4 assists)
Todd Burgan (12.1 points, 6.8 rebounds)
Otis Hill (12.7 points, 5.5 rebounds)
Marius Janulis (6.1 points, 2.1 rebounds)
J. B. Reafsnyder (5.5 points, 3.4 rebounds)

Schedule and results

|-
!colspan=9 style=| Regular Season

|-
!colspan=9 style=| Big East tournament

|-
!colspan=9 style=| NCAA tournament

Rankings

References

Syracuse Orange
Syracuse Orange men's basketball seasons
NCAA Division I men's basketball tournament Final Four seasons
Syracuse
Syracuse Orangemen basketball
Syracuse Orangemen basketball